Eggermühlen is a municipality in the district of Osnabrück, in Lower Saxony, Germany.
The Castle Eggermühlen is a former knight's seat founded in the 13th century. Owner is the baron of Boeselager.

References

Osnabrück (district)